Patna Bird Sanctuary is a protected area in Uttar Pradesh's Etah district encompassing a lentic lake that is an important wintering ground for migrating birds.. It is situated near a town Jalesar which is also known as Ghungroo Nagari or Bell City. With a lake area of only , it is the smallest bird sanctuary in Uttar Pradesh.

The water quality of the lake supports a wide range of avifauna during winter season. The entire lake area gets covered by profuse growth of macrophytic vegetation of water hyacinth and Potamogeton species during summers.

About 200,000 birds of 300 different bird species frequent the sanctuary. More than 106 species of migratory and resident birds are known to have their resting habitats around the lake. The important aquatic birds inhabiting lake are:
 Lesser whistling-duck  
 Graylag goose
 Comb duck
 Ruddy shelduck
 Gadwall
 Eurasian wigeon
 Indian spot-billed duck
 Northern shoveler
 Northern pintail
 Green-winged teal
 Common pochard
 Ferruginous duck
 Baer's pochard
 Tufted duck
 Indian peafowl
 Common quail
 Black francolin
 Gray francolin
 Little grebe
 Asian openbill
 Woolly-necked stork
 Black-necked stork
 Little cormorant
 Great cormorant
 Purple heron
 Cattle egret
 Indian pond-heron
 Black-headed ibis 
 Red-naped ibis
 Eurasian spoonbill
 Black-shouldered kite
 Egyptian vulture
 Booted eagle
 Bonelli's eagle
 Shikra
 Black kite
 Eurasian coot
 Sarus crane
 Black-winged stilt
 Black-tailed godwit
 Laughing dove
 Greater coucal
 Rose-ringed parakeet
 Plum-headed parakeet
 Long-tailed shrike
 Black drongo
 Rufous treepie
 Ashy-crowned sparrow-lark
 Bengal bushlark
 Red-vented bulbul
 Plain leaf warbler
 Ashy prinia
 Plain prinia
 Common babbler
 Oriental magpie-robin
 Brahminy starling
 Common myna
 Bank myna
 Purple sunbird
 Indian silverbill
 Scaly-breasted munia

See also
Shekha Jheel
Keetham Lake

References

External links 

http://etah.nic.in/patna.htm
http://www.harrivainolaphoto.com/patna.html

Bird sanctuaries of Uttar Pradesh
Etah district
1991 establishments in Uttar Pradesh
Protected areas established in 1991